A secret society is an organization whose activities, events, inner functioning, or membership are concealed. The society may or may not attempt to conceal its existence. The term usually excludes covert groups, such as intelligence agencies or guerrilla warfare insurgencies, that hide their activities and memberships but maintain a public presence.

Definitions
The exact qualifications for labeling a group a secret society are disputed, but definitions generally rely on the degree to which the organization insists on secrecy, and might involve the retention and transmission of secret knowledge, the denial of membership or knowledge of the group, the creation of personal bonds between members of the organization, and the use of secret rites or rituals which solidify members of the group.

Anthropologically and historically, secret societies have been deeply interlinked with the concept of the Männerbund, the all-male "warrior-band" or "warrior-society" of pre-modern cultures (see H. Schurtz, Alterklassen und Männerbünde, Berlin, 1902; A. Van Gennep, The Rites of Passage, Chicago, 1960).

A purported "family tree of secret societies" has been proposed, although it may not be comprehensive.

Alan Axelrod, author of the International Encyclopedia of Secret Societies and Fraternal Orders, defines a secret society as an organization that:
 is exclusive
 claims to own special secrets
 shows a strong inclination to favor its members.

Historian Richard B. Spence of the University of Idaho offered a similar three-pronged definition: 
 The group's existence is usually not kept secret, but some beliefs or practices are concealed from the public and require an oath of secrecy and loyalty to learn.
 The group promises superior status or knowledge to members. 
 The group's membership is in some way restrictive, such as by race, sex, religious affiliation, or invitation only.
Spence also proposes a sub-category of "Elite Secret Societies" (composed of high-income or socially influential people) and notes that secret societies have a frequent if not universal tendency towards factionalism, infighting, and claiming origins older than can be reliably documented. Spence's definition includes groups traditionally thought of as secret societies (Freemasons and Rosicrucians) and other groups not so traditionally classified such as certain organized crime cabals (the Mafia), religious groups (Order of Assassins and Thelema) and political movements (Bolsheviks and Black Dragon Society).

Historian Jasper Ridley argues that Freemasonry is, "the world's most powerful secret Society."

The organization "Opus Dei" (Latin for "Work of God") is portrayed as a "secret society" of the Catholic Church. Critics such as the Jesuit Wladimir Ledóchowski sometimes refer to Opus Dei as a Catholic (or Christian or "white") form of Freemasonry. Other critics label Opus Dei as "Holy Mafia" or "Santa Mafia" as the organisation is connected with various questionable practises including intense "brainwashing" of its members to exploit labor force as well as the direct involvement of members in severe crimes such as baby-trafficking in Spain under the dictator Francisco Franco.

Realms

Politics
Because some secret societies have political aims, they are illegal in several countries. Italy (Constitution of Italy, Section 2, Articles 13–28) and Poland, for example, ban secret political parties and political organizations in their constitutions.

Colleges and universities

Many student societies established on university campuses in the United States have been considered secret societies. Perhaps one of the most famous secret collegiate societies is Skull and Bones at Yale University. The influence of undergraduate secret societies at colleges such as Harvard College, Cornell University, Dartmouth College, Emory University, the University of Chicago, the University of Virginia, Georgetown University, New York University, and Wellesley College has been publicly acknowledged, if anonymously and circumspectly, since the 19th century.

British universities have a long history of secret societies or quasi-secret clubs, such as The Pitt Club at Cambridge University, Bullingdon Club at Oxford University, the Kate Kennedy Club, The Kensington Club and the Praetorian Club at the University of St Andrews, and the 16' Club at St David's College. Another British secret society is the Cambridge Apostles, founded as an essay and debating society in 1820. Not all British universities host solely academic secret societies; both The Night Climbers of Cambridge and The Night Climbers of Oxford require both brains and brawn.

In France, Vandermonde is the secret society of the Conservatoire National des Arts et Métiers.

Notable examples in Canada include Episkopon at the University of Toronto's Trinity College, and the Society of Thoth at the University of British Columbia.

Secret societies are disallowed in a few colleges. The Virginia Military Institute has rules that no cadet may join a secret society, and secret societies have been banned at Oberlin College from 1847 to the present, and at Princeton University since the beginning of the 20th century.

Confraternities in Nigeria are secret-society-like student groups within higher education. The exact death toll from confraternity activities is unclear. One estimate in 2002 was that 250 people had been killed in campus cult-related murders in the previous decade, while the Exam Ethics Project lobby group estimated that 115 students and teachers had been killed between 1993 and 2003.

The Mandatory Monday Association is thought to operate out of a variety of Australian universities including the Australian Defence Force Academy. The Association has numerous chapters that meet only on Mondays to discuss business and carry out rituals.

The only secret society abolished and then legalized is that of The Philomaths, which is now a legitimate academic association founded on a strict selection of its members.

Internet
While their existence had been speculated for years, Internet-based secret societies first became known to the public in 2012 when Cicada 3301 began recruiting from the public via Internet-based puzzles. The goals of the society remain unknown, but it is believed to be involved in cryptography.

By location

Africa 
The following contemporary and historic secret societies formed in Africa, by country:

Cameroon 

 Ekpe

Ghana 

 Simo

Guinea 

 Poro
 Sande society

Ivory Coast 

 Poro
 Sande society

Liberia 

 Crocodile Society
 Poro
 Sande society

Mali 

 Simo

Nigeria 
 Ekpe
 Nze na Ozo
 Ogboni

Sierra Leone 

 Crocodile Society
 Leopard Society
 Poro
 Sande society
 Simo

South Africa 
 Afrikaner Broederbond
 Afrikanerbond

Zimbabwe 
 Nyau

Asia

China 
Secret societies played a major role in Chinese affairs for centuries. They created and supported patriotism until they were disbanded by the Communist regime around 1950. Examples of Chinese secret societies include:

 Hai San Secret Society
 Red Lanterns 
 Red Spear Society
 Tiandihui, Society of the Heaven and the Earth
 Yellow Sand Society
 White Lotus

India 
Secret societies in India include:

 Paramahansa Mandali

Japan 
Secret societies in Japan include:
 Black Dragon Society
 Double Leaf Society
 Gen'yōsha
 Green Dragon 
 Sakurakai or Cherry Blossom Society

Malaysia 
Secret societies in the Malaysia include:

 Ang Soon Tong
 Ghee Hin Kongsi
 Wah Kee

Philippines 
Secret societies in the Philippines include:
 La Liga Filipina
 Katipunan

Singapore 

 Ang Soon Tong
 Ghee Hin Kongsi
 Salakau

 Wah Kee

Australia 
Secret societies in Australia include:

 Freemasonry
 Odd Fellows
 Royal Antediluvian Order of Buffaloes
 Tong

Europe 
Several secret societies existing across Europe, including:
 Ancient Order of Freesmiths (Freischmiede)
 Freemasonry
 Rosicrucianism
Other organizations are listed by country.

Albania 

 Black Society for Salvation
 Secret Committee for the Liberation of Albania

Bulgaria 

 Bulgarian Secret Central Revolutionary Committee
 Bulgarian Secret Revolutionary Brotherhood
 Bulgarian Secret Central Revolutionary Committee
 Macedonian Youth Secret Revolutionary Organization

Finland 

 Aurora Society
 Ordo Templi Orientis
 Valhallaorden

France 

 Association of the Polish Youth "Zet"
 Bourbaki group
 La Cagoule
 Carbonari
 Compagnons du Devoir
 Company of the Blessed Sacrament
 Ellinoglosso Xenodocheio
 Hiéron du Val d'Or
 Order of the Solar Temple
 Priory of Sion

 Société Angélique
 Society of the Rights of Man

Germany 

 Ancient Order of Freesmiths
 Association of the Polish Youth "Zet"
 Germanenorden

 Illuminati
 Order of the New Templars
 Ordo Templi Orientis

 Thule Society
 Tugendbund
 United Ancient Order of Druids

Greece 

 Epsilon Team
 Ethniki Etaireia

 Ordo Templi Orientis

Ireland 
 Defenders
 Hellfire Club
 Irish Republican Brotherhood
 Molly Maguires
 Royal Arch Purple
 Whiteboys

Italy 

 Carbonari

 Fascio Operaio

 Knights of the Apocalypse
 Propaganda Due

Poland 

 Association of the Polish Youth "Zet"

 Ordo Templi Orientis

 Zarzewie

Portugal 

 Carbonária

Russia 

 Association of the Polish Youth "Zet"

 Lyubomudry

 Ordo Templi Orientis

 Petrashevsky Circle

 Secret Macedonian-Adrianople Circle
 Southern Society of the Decembrists

 Union of Prosperity
 Union of Salvation

Serbia 

 Black Hand

 Main Board for Serb Liberation

 Ordo Templi Orientis

 Serbian secret organization in eastern Bosnia

 White Hand

Spain 

 The Disinherited
 Mano Negra (Black Hand)
 Order of the Solar Temple

 Ordo Templi Orientis

 Society of the Exterminating Angel
 Spanish Military Union

United Kingdom 
 A∴A∴
 Bullingdon Club
 Calves' Head Club
 Confederacy 
 Gormogons
 5 Hertford Street
 Hellfire Club
 Hermetic Order of the Golden Dawn
 The Horseman's Word
 Molly Maguires
 National Action
 The Night Climbers of Oxford
 Nordic League
 Odd Fellows
 Odin Brotherhood
 Order of Chaeronea
 Order of Druids
 Order of Free Gardeners
 Ordo Templi Orientis

 The 16' Club
 The School of Night
 Scotch Cattle
 Sealed Knot
 Tong 
 United Ancient Order of Druids

North America

Canada 
Secret societies in Canada that are non-collegiate include:

 Fenians 
 Freemasonry 
 Hunters' Lodges
 Independent Order of Odd Fellows
 Ku Klux Klan
 Order of the Solar Temple
 Order of Jacques-Cartier
 Ordo Templi Orientis
 P.E.O. Sisterhood
 Tong

Cuba 

 Abakuá

United States 
Secret societies in the United States that are non-collegiate include:
 Abakuá
 Fenians
 Freemasonry
 Hunters' Lodges
 Knights of Columbus
 Knights of the Golden Circle
 Ku Klux Klan
 Molly Maguires
 Odd Fellows
 Order of the Star Spangled Banner
 Tong

Mexico 
 Feminine Brigades of St. Joan of Arc

South America

Brazil 
 Shindo Renmei

Opposition

The Catholic Church strongly opposed secret societies, especially the Freemasons. It did relent somewhat in the United States and allowed membership in labour unions and the Knights of Columbus, but not the Masons. Some Christian denominations continue to forbid their members from joining secret societies in the 21st century. For example, the Allegheny Wesleyan Methodist Connection.

See also
 Fraternal order

References

Further reading
 
 Dickie, John. The Craft: How the Freemasons Made the Modern World (PublicAffairs, 2020). excerpt; scholarly history.

 Dumenil, Lynn. Freemasonry and American Culture: 1880-1930 (Princeton UP, 1984), major scholarly survey. excerpt

 Gist, Noel P. Secret Societies: A Cultural Study of Fraternalism in the United States (1941)
 Harwood, W. S. (May 1897). "Secret Societies in America." The North American Review, vol. 164, no. 486. .
 

 

 Klimczuk, Stephen, and Gerald Warner (2009). Secret Places, Hidden Sanctuaries: Uncovering Mysterious Sights, Symbols, and Societies. New York: Sterling Publishing Company.

 
 Ownby, David, and Mary F. Somers Heidhues, eds. Secret Societies Reconsidered: Perspectives on the Social History of Early Modern South China and Southeast Asia (Routledge, 2016) excerpt
   

 
 

 Simmel, Georg. "The Sociology of Secrecy and of Secret Societies"  The American Journal of Sociology (1906)  11#4 pp. 441-498 a famous classic by Georg Simmel,  online

External links

 Secret Societies: a very short history – Documents of Freemasons, Jesuits, Illuminati, Carbonari, Burschenschaften and other organizations
 Stevens, The cyclopædia of fraternities (2nd ed.). A dated review of the subject.

 
Secret societies in Albania
Secret societies in Canada
Secret societies in Bulgaria
Secret societies in Finland
Secret societies in France
Secret societies in Germany
Secret societies in Greece
Secret societies in India
Secret societies in Italy
Secret societies in Poland